The following is a list of educational institutions in Cuddalore District

Secondary schools
 Akshara Vidyaashram, Unnamalai chetty Chavadi, Kondur.
 A.R.L.M Matriculation Higher Secondary School, Cuddalore
 Balavihar Matriculation Higher Secondary School, Panruti
 CK School of Practical Knowledge, Anna Nagar, Cuddalore
 Infant Matriculation Higher Secondary School, Vriddhachalam
 G V School, Chidambaram
 John Dewey Matriculation Higher Secondary School, Panruti
 Krishnaswamy Memorial Matriculation Higher Secondary School, Cuddalore
 Isha Vidhya Matriculation School, Madavapallam, Samiyarpettai PO.
 Jawahar Higher Secondary School, Neyveli.
 Kendriya Vidyalaya- KV Neyveli, Neyveli TS.
 Krishnaswamy Vidyanikethan, S Kumarapuram, Cuddalore.
 KSR Hi-tech School, Budhamoor, Virudhachalam.
 Lakshmi Chordia Memorial Matric Higher Secondary School, SR Nagar, Cuddalore 2.
 Mahatma Gandhi International School, Reddychavady.
 Nirmala Matriculation Higher Secondary School, Kanagasabai nagar, Chidambaram.
 Savior Jesus Matriculation Higher Secondary School, Cuddalore.
 Seventh Day Adventist School, Neyveli Thermal Bus stand.
 Shemford Futuristic School, Perumal street, Chidambaram.
 Sri Valliammal School for Knowledge and Wisdom, Kesava nagar, Cuddalore.
 St. Annes Girls Higher Secondary School, Manjakuppam, Cuddalore.
St. Anne's College of Engineering and Technology, Panruti Taluk, Cuddalore
St. Joseph's Higher Secondary School NT, Manjakuppam, Cuddalore
 St. Joseph's Higher Secondary School, Cumming Pet, Thirupapuliyur, Cuddalore
 St. Mary's Matriculation Higher Secondary School, Cuddalore
 St. Paul Matriculation Higher Secondary School, Neyveli.
 Indian Matriculation Higher Secondary School, Tittagudi
 Sri Gnanaguru Vidyalayaa Matriculation Higher Secondary School, Tittagudi
 Danish Mission Higher Secondary School, Viruddhachalam
 Government Boys Higher Secondary School, Viruddhachalam
 Government Girls Higher Secondary School, Viruddhachalam
 Government Higher Secondary School, Puthupet
 Kalaimagal Matric Higher Secondary School, kattumannar koil

Medical Colleges
 Rajah Muthiah Medical College, Annamalai university, Chidambaram

Engineering Colleges 
 Dr. Navalar Nedunchezhiyan College of Engineering, Thozhudur, Cuddalore
 University College of Engineering, Panruti
 St Anne's college of engineering, Panruti
 CK College of Engineering & Technology, Chellankuppam, Cuddalore
 Krishnasamy College of Engineering & Technology, S.Kumarapuram, Cuddalore

Universities
Annamalai University
Anna University

References

External links

Cuddalore
Education in Cuddalore district